Theophilus Evans (February 1693 – 11 September 1767) was a Welsh clergyman and historian.

Life
Evans' father was from Pen-y-wenallt and he was christened in the church in Llandygwydd in Cardiganshire in 1693.

Evans served curacies in Brecknockshire and incumbencies in both counties. He is best known for his work Drych y Prif Oesoedd (Mirror of the Early Centuries) (1716; revised ed. 1740) where with some literary talent but with an absence of critical method (mixing history with legend) he endeavours to justify the independent origins of British Christianity. Evans was supported by Sackville Gwynne, the squire of Glanbrân. In 1727, Evans became the private chaplain of Marmaduke Gwynne, Sackville's heir, but they eventually parted because of Gwynne's support for Howell Harris and the Methodist cause.

Works
Drych y Prif Oesoedd (1716)
A History of Modern Enthusiasm (1752)

Bibliography
Theophilus Evans: Drych y Prif Oesoedd (ed. Garfield H.Hughes, 1961)

Sources

1693 births
1767 deaths
18th-century Welsh Anglican priests
18th-century Welsh historians